Kandil (from ) refers to five Islamic holy nights, celebrated in Ottoman and Muslim Balkan communities, related to the life of the Islamic prophet Muhammad, when the minarets are illuminated and special prayers are made. It is a tradition dated back to the Ottoman Sultan Selim II of the 16th century, who with the support of the shaykh ul-Islam of the time, thought it was appropriate to light up the minarets on mosques for these blessed occasions. The name "Kandil" derived from the Arabic qindīl meaning chandelier or candle, and refers to an oil lamp. The Kandil nights play a less significant role than the Bayram festivals.

In Turkey, a special smaller form of simit is commonly sold on Kandil days.

The five Kandil nights
Mevlid Kandili (Mawlid an-Nabi) – The birth of Muhammad
Regaip Kandili (Laylat al-Raghaib) – Night prayers are answered and Muhammad's conception 
Miraç Kandili (Lailat al Miraj) – Muhammad's ascent to heaven
Berat Kandili (Mid-Sha'ban) – Forgiveness of sins and determining of destiny for the next year
Kadir Gecesi (Laylat al-Qadr) – First revelation of the Quran to Muhammad

References

 
Islamic festivals
Islamic holy days
Islamic calendar